Pitman Township (T11N R5W) is located in Montgomery County, Illinois, United States. As of the 2010 census, its population was 508 and it contained 227 housing units.

Geography

Demographics

Adjacent townships
 Bois D'Arc Township (north)
 Harvel Township (east)
 Raymond Township (southeast)
 Zanesville Township, Montgomery County (south)
 Nilwood Township, Macoupin County (west)
 Girard Township (northwest)

References

External links
City-data.com
Illinois State Archives
Historical Society of Montgomery County

Townships in Montgomery County, Illinois
1872 establishments in Illinois
Townships in Illinois